Bartosz Waglewski (Fisz) born March 19, 1978, in Warszawa, Poland is a Polish rap artist. He is the son of musician Wojciech Waglewski and older brother of Emade (Piotr Waglewski). He studied at Europejska Akademia Sztuk (EAS).

The musical style of Fisz is unconventional. At the very beginning of his career he started out as a hip-hop artist, but went experimental soon after releasing Tworzywo Sztuczne – Wielki Ciężki Słoń in 2004. Fisz and his producer Emade seek inspiration in black music giving soul, funk and jazz touch to their projects. His lyrics are often based on wordplay.

In 2008, he founded a rock band Kim Nowak together with his brother Emade and Michał Sobolewski. The band released two studio albums, Kim Nowak (2010) and Wilk (2012).

Internationally he gave concerts on stages of London, Berlin, Bordeaux, Calvi, Dijon, Marseille, Vienna, Budapest, Prague, Paris and Saint Vallier.

Discography

Solo albums

Collaborative albums

Video albums

Music videos

Awards

Fisz has been nominated to Fryderyk Award eight times.

In 2000 he received two nominations in the categories New Face of Fonography (debiut roku) and Album of the Year – Hip-Hop/Rap (Album Roku Rap/Hip hop) "Polepione dźwięki". A year later, in 2001, he received another nomination in the same category for "Na wylot". In 2003 Fisz, together with Emade, was nominated as Tworzywo Sztuczne in the category Club Album of the Year for "F3". They were also nominated for the Alternative Album of The Year (Album Roku Muzyka Alternatywna) the following year ("Wielki Ciężki Słoń"). In 2005 "Fru!" was nominated in the same category. 2006 brought two more nominations for the Hip hop/R&B Album of The Year ("Piątek 13-nastego") and the Group of the Year (together with Emade).

In addition he has won or has been nominated for the following awards:

the 2000 Machiner Award for "Polepione dźwięki" in the category Niche Album
the Album of The Year from the Fluid magazine for "Polepione dźwięki"
Paszport Polityki for "Polepione dźwięki" (nomination)
the Most Important Polish Performer in 2001 and the Polish Video of the Year for "Tajemnica" from the magazine Klan
Przekrój magazine Fenomen Award 2005
Paszport Polityki in the category Pop-Rock-Scene ("Piątek 13")

References

External links 
 Asfalt Records label
 MySpace

1978 births
Living people
Rappers from Warsaw
Polish rock singers
Polish lyricists
21st-century Polish male singers
21st-century Polish singers
Polish rappers